Robert McLaren (born 19 April 1945) is a Canadian hurdler. He competed in the men's 400 metres hurdles at the 1968 Summer Olympics.

References

1945 births
Living people
Athletes (track and field) at the 1968 Summer Olympics
Canadian male hurdlers
Olympic track and field athletes of Canada
Athletes from Victoria, British Columbia
Pan American Games medalists in athletics (track and field)
Pan American Games silver medalists for Canada
Pan American Games bronze medalists for Canada
Athletes (track and field) at the 1967 Pan American Games
Medalists at the 1967 Pan American Games